The 1940 Missouri lieutenant gubernatorial election was held on November 5, 1940. Democratic incumbent Frank Gaines Harris defeated Republican nominee William P. Elmer with 51.95% of the vote.

Primary elections
Primary elections were held on August 6, 1940.

Democratic primary

Candidates
Frank Gaines Harris, incumbent Lieutenant Governor
John G. Christy
Dan D. Porter

Results

Republican primary

Candidates
William P. Elmer, former State Representative
James E. Ford
Julius J. Scheske
George Bartholomaeus

Results

General election

Candidates
Major party candidates
Frank Gaines Harris, Democratic
William P. Elmer, Republican

Other candidates
Ada M. Demaree, Socialist
William J. Cady, Prohibition
Michael L. Hiltner, Socialist Labor

Results

References

1940
Gubernatorial
Missouri